The Dare County Board of Commissioners is the governing body of Dare County, North Carolina.  It runs in the manner of a county commission.  It has seven seats held by elected officials called County Commissioners.  The Commissioners are elected at large in countywide elections and serve four-year staggered terms.  The Board elects a chairman and vice-chair for a one-year term at its organizational meeting in December.

The Board has countywide responsibility for educational funding, libraries, Parks and Recreation,
and tax assessment. The Board is the sole governing body for the unincorporated areas of Dare
County including Colington, Martin’s Point, Manns Harbor, Stumpy Point, East Lake, Wanchese, northern Roanoke Island, and all of Hatteras Island. In these areas, the County is responsible for planning and zoning, solid waste management and law enforcement.

Districts
District 1:  East Lake, Stumpy Point, Manns Harbor, Manteo, Wanchese
District 2:  Kill Devil Hills, Colington, Nags Head
District 3:  Duck, Southern Shores, Kitty Hawk
District 4:  Rodanthe, Waves, Salvo, Avon, Buxton, Frisco, Hatteras

Meetings
The Board meets on the first Monday of the month at 9:00 AM and the third Monday of each month at 5:00 PM at the Dare County Administrative Annex located at 954 Marshall C. Collins Drive in Manteo.

Issues
In 2008, the Board adopted a resolution making English the official language of Dare County.  The resolution was crafted by Jack Shea.  The Commissioners voting for the resolution were Jack Shea, Richard Johnson, Mike Johnson and Max Dutton.  Dissenting Commissioners were Warren Judge, Allen Burrus and Virginia Tillett.

List of Dare County Boards of Commissioners

2014 Board

Chairman

Warren Judge

District 3

Kitty Hawk

Duck

Southern Shores	

Warren Judge, Chairman

Vice Chairman

Allen Burrus

District 4

Chicamacomico

Avon

Buxton

Frisco

Hatteras

Allen Burrus, Vice Chairman

Commissioner

Wally Overman

District 1

Roanoke Island

Dare County Mainland

Wally Overman, Commissioner

Commissioner

Virginia Tillett

District 1

Roanoke Island

Dare County Mainland	

Virginia Tillett, Commissioner

Commissioner

Max Dutton

District 2

Nags Head

Colington

Kill Devil Hills

Max Dutton, Commissioner

Commissioner

Jack Shea

District 5

At Large

Jack Shea, Commissioner

Commissioner

Robert Woodard

District 2

Nags Head

Colington

Kill Devil Hills

Bob Woodard, Commissioner

2011 Board
Chairman:  Warren Judge

Vice Chairman:  Allen Burrus

Allen Burrus was appointed to the Board in February 2006 to fill the remaining term of Joseph "Mac" Midgett who died in Jan 2006.  Burrus was then elected to the seat in 2008.

2010 Election

All incumbent Commissioners ran for re-election in 2010.  
Virginia Tillett in District 1 ran unopposed and was re-elected.  
Max Dutton in District 2 ran unopposed and was re-elected.  
Jack Shea, in District 5 (At-Large District) was challenged by Robin Mann. Shea won re-election 53/47.

2006 Election

Max Dutton was elected in 2006 in an upset over incumbent Chairman Stan White, 52% to 48% in the Primary.  He was unopposed in the General Election.

Jack Shea was unopposed in the primary.  He defeated Rex Tillett in the General Election.  Tillett is the nephew of North Carolina State Senator Marc Basnight.

Virginia Tillett won the primary over two challengers, Robin Mann and Sybil Daniels Ross.  She defeated John M. Robbins, III in the General Election.

References

 
Dare County, North Carolina